This is a list of Australian films of the 1960s. For a complete alphabetical list, see :Category:Australian films.

1960s

See also
 1960 in Australia
 1961 in Australia
 1962 in Australia
 1963 in Australia
 1964 in Australia
 1965 in Australia
 1966 in Australia
 1967 in Australia
 1968 in Australia
 1969 in Australia

External links
 Australian film at the Internet Movie Database

 
 
1960s
Australian